The  is an underground rapid transit line in Osaka, Japan, operated by Osaka Metro.

The Sakaisuji Line is unique in the Osaka Metro system in that despite being regulated as a tramway under the Railway Business Act like the other lines, the line was constructed as an extension of a line governed as a railway, specifically the Hankyu Senri Line, to which the Sakaisuji Line connects to at its northern end at Tenjimbashisuji Rokuchōme Station. Through services using both Osaka Municipal Subway and Hankyu rolling stock operates to and from the Senri Line and Arashiyama Line via the Kyoto Main Line.

History
The Sakaisuji Line was first envisioned in the Urban Transportation Council Report No. 3 (1958) as an underground line running from Tenjimbashisuji Rokuchōme to Tenma via Sakaisuji and Dobutsuen-mae, and it was to be operated by Hankyu Railway instead of the Osaka prefectural government. In 1963, the Urban Transportation Council Report No. 7 (1963) recommended that the southern terminus of the Sakaisuji Line be at Tengachaya instead of Tenma.

Later unrealised plans for the Sakaisuji Line included two separate extensions to Nakamozu and Sugimotochō, and at one point it was envisioned that through-services between the standard-gauge Hankyu Railway and the narrow-gauge Nankai Railway would be realised by connecting them together with the Sakaisuji Line through the use of dual gauge tracks, however that plan was abandoned due to the different electrification systems used by Hankyu and Nankai.

The Sakaisuji Line opened on December 6, 1969 between Tenjimbashisuji Rokuchōme and Dōbutsuen-mae, at which point the previous ground-level southern terminal of the Hankyu Senri Line at Tenjinbashi was closed. The line was extended from Dōbutsuen-mae to Tengachaya on 4 March 1993, as a metro-based replacement of the former Nankai Tennoji Branch Line which closed at the same time.

Stations
Station numbers on the Sakaisuji Line (excluding Hankyu-operated stations) are indicated by the letter "K".

The seasonal Limited Express service known as "Hozu" (operated by Hankyu between Tengachaya and Arashiyama) stops at the stations with a "●", while other trains (local trains, Sakaisuji Semi-Express trains, and trains to ) stop at every station.

Rolling stock 
The Sakaisuji Line is the first Osaka subway line to use overhead lines instead of third rail for power collection. All trains are based at Higashi-Suita Depot located on the Hankyu Senri Line.

Current
 Osaka Municipal Subway 66 series (since 1993)
 Hankyu 1300 series (since 2014)
 Hankyu 3300 series (since 1969)
 Hankyu 5300 series (since 1979)
 Hankyu 7300 series (since 1989)
 Hankyu 8300 series (since 1989)

Former
 Osaka Municipal Subway 60 series (1969–2003)

See also
 List of railway lines in Japan

References

Osaka Metro
Railway lines opened in 1969
Rail transport in Osaka Prefecture
1969 establishments in Japan